Torchlight is a 2018 Indian Tamil-language drama thriller film produced, written and directed by Majith. The film stars Sadha, Riythvika and Thirumurugan in the lead roles. The film is produced by the production banner Confident Film Café. The film is loosely based on 1970 Bollywood film Chetna and the plot is based on the true incidents which happened in the 1990s in the Tamil Nadu-Andhra highways. The film was launched in February 2017 and the principal photography of the film commenced on 23 February 2017. The film was theatrical released on 7 September 2018 and received positive reviews. The film was also dubbed in Telugu version as Srimathi 21F.

Plot 

The story revolves around a woman who has been forced to serve as a sex worker. she was pregnant by a man but she kept her secret and worked as a sex worker. in her 8th month she continued her job and made money. later that night she vomited and lost her child .

Cast 
 Sadha as Nila
 Riythvika as Kavitha
 Thirumurugan
 Varun Udhay
 A. Venkatesh
 C. Ranganathan
 Saravana Sakthi
 Soodhu Kavvum Sivakumar
 Bava Lakshmanan
Meghana R

Production 
The filmmakers announced the project in February 2017 and revealed that the film would be set on the prostitution and about the lives of women who miserably suffer while working in the streets. The film was set in the backdrop of the early 1980s and 1990s. Actress Sadha was roped in to play the lead role and made her comeback into Kollywood industry after 2015 film Eli.

The first look poster of the film was unveiled by the director on 1 December 2017.

Release 
The film's release was delayed due to sanctions imposed by the Indian Censor Board, resulting in approximately 87 cuts and an initial refusal to certify the film on the grounds that it contained 'vulgar content'. The director flew to Mumbai and cleared the censorship issue and the film received an A certificate from the Censor Board of Film Certification and was allowed to release.

Critical reception
Maalai Malar positively reviewed the film, rating it 83 out of 100. Samayam Tamil was less positive, rating it 2.5 out of 5 stars.

References 

2010s Tamil-language films
Indian thriller drama films
2018 thriller drama films
Films about women in India
2018 films
Films about prostitution in India
Indian films based on actual events